Wilkins's finch (Nesospiza wilkinsi), also known as Wilkins's bunting or the grosbeak bunting, is a species of bird in the family Thraupidae.  It is restricted to Inaccessible Island (subspecies dunnei) and Nightingale Island (nominate wilkinsi) of the Tristan da Cunha archipelago, part of the British overseas territory of Saint Helena in the South Atlantic Ocean.  Its natural habitats are temperate shrubland and subantarctic grassland.

The common name and Latin binomial commemorate the Australian polar explorer and ornithologist Captain Sir George Hubert Wilkins.

References

External links
BirdLife International species factsheet

Wilkins's finch
Wilkins's finch
Wilkins's finch
Taxonomy articles created by Polbot